Thallarcha fusa is a species of moth of the subfamily Arctiinae. It was first described by George Hampson in 1900 and it is found in Australia.

References

Lithosiini
Moths described in 1900